Trauma is a Time Machine is a 2018 American drama film directed by Angelica Zollo, starring Augie Duke and Gabe Fazio.

Cast
 Augie Duke as Helen
 Gabe Fazio as Toby
 Elizabeth A. Davis as Georgia
 Robyn Peterson as Woman at the Bus Stop
 Ella Loudon as Joan
 Max Duane as Man One
 Joseph Reiver as Man Two
 Karl Scully as Karl

Release
The film was released on 20 September 2019.

Reception
Katie Walsh of the Los Angeles Times wrote that while the narrative was lacking in "structural integrity", Zollo and Duke "create a courageously personal, experimental piece, tapping into a raw emotional state not often rendered on screen with such depth and intelligence."

Frank Scheck of The Hollywood Reporter wrote that while Duke "delivers a shattering, highly physical performance that fully conveys her character’s complex mixture of anger, depression and disorientation", she is "unable to overcome the film’s inertia and repetitiveness, its vague proceedings stretched out interminably to reach a feature-length running time".

References

External links
 
 

American drama films
2018 drama films